Chi Wo "Daniel" Lee (Lee Chi Wo, born April 9, 1977) is an athlete from Hong Kong.  He competes in the triathlon.

Lee is the leading triathlete in Hong Kong, being the first triathlon representative from Hong Kong in the Sydney Olympic Games. Lee competed at the second Olympic triathlon at the 2004 Summer Olympics.  He placed forty-third with a total time of 2:03:30.39. During the 2006 Asian Games he claimed the silver medal.

He graduated from the Chinese University of Hong Kong.

Lee Chi Wo is sponsored by Herbalife.

References

External links
 

1977 births
Living people
Hong Kong male triathletes
Olympic triathletes of Hong Kong
Triathletes at the 2004 Summer Olympics
Triathletes at the 2008 Summer Olympics
Triathletes at the 2010 Asian Games
Triathletes at the 2006 Asian Games
Asian Games medalists in triathlon
Asian Games silver medalists for Hong Kong
Medalists at the 2006 Asian Games